Pilham is a village and civil parish in the West Lindsey district of Lincolnshire, England. The population of the civil parish at the 2001 census was 76. Pilham is mentioned in the Domesday Book (1086) as Pileham.

References

External links

Villages in Lincolnshire
Civil parishes in Lincolnshire
West Lindsey District